"Fire" is a song by American singer Beth Ditto. Produced and co-written by Jennifer Decilveo, it was released by Virgin Records in April 2017 as the lead single from Ditto's solo debut album, Fake Sugar. The single peaked on Billboards Alternative Songs at number 40. The music video for the track was also released in April 2017.

"Fire" is a Southern rock song and features gospel-indebted vocals.

Critical reception
musicOMH's John Murphy stated that the track "gets things started in a suitably smouldering way, a soulful, swaggering number that’s both slow-burning and, when the chorus kicks in, gloriously unrestrained." Graeme Virtue of The Guardian described the song as "a sexy mega-thumper enhanced by mournful melodica toots." Stereogum critic Pranav Trewn called the song "an audacious, groovy slow-burner built on a muted bassline and sold via firecracker guitars and an impeccable-as-ever vocal performance". According to The Independents Andy Gill, the track's "predatory throb explodes into a chugging fuzz-rock boogie streaked with squalling guitars."

Charts

References

External links
 "Fire" on YouTube

2017 singles
Southern rock songs
2017 songs
Songs written by Jennifer Decilveo
Songs written by Beth Ditto
Virgin Records singles